Danesfort is a small rural area in County Kilkenny, Ireland, located approximately 6 km from Kilkenny City on the N10 (Waterford to Kilkenny). It is also the name of a civil parish in County Kilkenny. The local area consists of one primary school, a local GAA pitch, a Roman Catholic Church (including graveyard). A creche, a community centre and a care home for the elderly. The townland is divided almost equally either side of the road. Danesfort's flag is the same colour (black and amber) as that of its county, Kilkenny.

Politics
Danesfort is officially a political region of Bennettsbridge, a nearby town. The townland itself however is considered part of Kilkenny City in terms of GAA structure, as a postal division (by An Post) and in terms of banking (Kilkenny City Credit Union serves the area.

See also
 List of townlands in County Kilkenny

References

Townlands of County Kilkenny